Chrysotachina is a genus of bristle flies in the family Tachinidae. There are at least 25 described species in Chrysotachina.

Species
These 27 species belong to the genus Chrysotachina:

 Chrysotachina alcedo (Loew, 1869) i c g
 Chrysotachina aldrichi Nunez, Couri & Guimaraes, 2002 c g
 Chrysotachina amazonica (Townsend, 1934)
 Chrysotachina auriceps O'Hara, 2002 i c g
 Chrysotachina braueri Townsend, 1931 c g
 Chrysotachina cinerea (Townsend, 1919) c g
 Chrysotachina cristiverpa (O'Hara, 2002) c g
 Chrysotachina currani Nunez, Couri & Guimaraes, 2002 c g
 Chrysotachina erythrostoma Nunez, Couri & Guimaraes, 2002 c g
 Chrysotachina infrequens O'Hara, 2002 i c g
 Chrysotachina longipennis O'Hara, 2002 i c g b
 Chrysotachina ornata (Townsend, 1927) c g
 Chrysotachina panamensis Curran, 1939 c g
 Chrysotachina peruviana Curran, 1939 c g
 Chrysotachina purpurea Curran, 1939 c g
 Chrysotachina ruficauda (Curran, 1927) c g
 Chrysotachina ruficornis (Walker, 1853) c g
 Chrysotachina setifera (Townsend, 1915) c g
 Chrysotachina slossonae (Coquillett, 1897) i
 Chrysotachina subviridis (Wulp, 1892) c g
 Chrysotachina tatei Curran, 1939 c g
 Chrysotachina tieta Nunez, Couri & Guimaraes, 2002 c g
 Chrysotachina townsendi Curran, 1939 c g
 Chrysotachina tropicalis Nunez, Couri & Guimaraes, 2002 c g
 Chrysotachina verticalis (Reinhard, 1935) c g
 Chrysotachina viridis Nunez, Couri & Guimaraes, 2002 c g
 Chrysotachina willistoni Curran, 1939 c g

Data sources: i = ITIS, c = Catalogue of Life, g = GBIF, b = Bugguide.net

References

Further reading

External links

 
 

Tachininae